Perasia helvina is a moth of the family Noctuidae first described by Achille Guenée in 1852. It is found in Mexico, Costa Rica and Cuba.

References

Moths described in 1852
Catocalinae